I'll Make U Famous is the fourth album by the American rap group Da Youngsta's. In this album they referred to themselves as Illy Funkstaz.

Track listing 
 "I'll Make U Famous" - 4:03
 "Bloodshed and War" (featuring Mobb Deep) (Produced by Quran Goodman) - 5:00
 "Everyman 4 Theyself" - 4:34
 "Gotta Get da Cheese" - 4:08
 "U R Everything" - 3:54
 "Bad 2 da Bone" - 4:54
 "Verbal Glock" - 3:57
 "24 Hrs. 2 Live" - 5:17
 "Incredible" Featuring Big Tabb and Mentally Gifted (M.G) - 3:57
 "Murda" - 3:31
 "If I Had a Million" - 3:39
 "I'll Make U Famous" (Remix) - 4:04
 "Bloodshed and War" (featuring Mobb Deep) (Remix) - 5:27

1995 albums
Da Youngsta's albums